Himanshu Yadav is an Indian politician of the Samajwadi Party. He is a member of the 18th Uttar Pradesh Assembly, representing the Shekhupur Assembly constituency.

References 

Uttar Pradesh MLAs 2022–2027
Samajwadi Party politicians from Uttar Pradesh
Year of birth missing (living people)
Living people